The United Chinese Community Enrichment Services Society ( or 中僑/中侨 Zhōng Qiáo) or S.U.C.C.E.S.S., is a Canadian social services organization headquartered in Vancouver, British Columbia. , Queenie Choo was the CEO of the organization.

History
In 1973, the organization was founded to provide social services for Chinese, including recent immigrants. It was founded by several persons of Hong Kong origin, including Maggie Ip, who became the first chairperson, Jonathan Lau, Linda Leong, Mei-Chan Lin, and Pauline To.

Since 1989, an increasing number of clients originated from Taiwan and the Mainland, altering the up-until-then almost entirely Hong Kong demographic base. S.U.C.C.E.S.S., in 1990, served 60,000 people, mostly persons between 20 and 40, with 110,000 contacts. As of 1991, its headquarters were on the second floor of the Beijing Building in the Vancouver Chinatown and it maintained branch offices in South Vancouver, Burnaby, and Richmond.

As of 2003, it had 350 employees, a headquarters in Vancouver, and 11 other offices in the Greater Vancouver region. As of the same year, its budget was $16 million.

The organization, from 2006 until 2010, was headed by CEO Tung Chan, a former Vancouver city councilor.

In 2014, SUCCESS reportedly had posted signs in Richmond that were only in Chinese during the midst of a local controversy regarding Chinese-only signs. Queenie Choo apologized and had the signs taken down.

, SUCCESS was listed as an "Overseas Chinese Services Organization" by the Overseas Chinese Affairs Office (OCAO), at the time part of the State Council of the People's Republic of China. In 2018, OCAO was absorbed by the Chinese Communist Party's United Front Work Department. 

During the COVID-19 pandemic, the organization received a $499,747 grant from the Public Health Agency of Canada's Immunization Partnership Fund to increase uptake of COVID-19 vaccines among immigrants in the Metro Vancouver area.

See also
 Chinese Canadians in Greater Vancouver

References
 Guo, Shibao. An interpretive study of a voluntary organization serving Chinese immigrants in Vancouver, British Columbia, Canada (PhD thesis) (Archive). University of British Columbia. See profile. Available at ProQuest.
 Guo, Shibao. "SUCCESS: A Chinese Voluntary Association in Vancouver" (Archive). BC Studies. No. 154, Summer 2007. p. 97-119. See profile at the University of British Columbia.
 Tan, Hugh Xiaobing. "Chinese-Canadian Associations in Vancouver." Canada and Hong Kong Update (加港研究通訊 P: Jiā Gǎng Yánjiū Tōngxùn) 4 (Spring 1991). p. 11-12 (PDF document: p. 61-62/224). PDF version (Archive), txt file (Archive).

Notes

External links

 

Chinese-Canadian culture in Vancouver
Chinese Canadian organizations
History of Chinese Canadians
History of Vancouver
Organizations based in Vancouver
Overseas Chinese organisations